Natalie Hershberger (born February 22, 2004) is an American taekwondo athlete and author of Kick it Fit with Natalie and Tough Girls Finish First. Beginning in 2016, Hershberger wrote a regular column featured in the Tae Kwon Do Times known as "Kickchat with Nat", focused on taekwondo training.

Hershberger began training in taekwondo at the age of five. She is a current USA Taekwondo National Team Member with the goal of representing the United States in the 2024 Summer Olympics. Hershberger has won two AAU Junior Olympic Games titles (2012 and 2013) and seven national championship titles (AAU and USAT). Hershberger was named a 2015 Sports Illustrated SportsKid of the Year finalist (SKOTY), making her the first ever martial artist to be recognized as a finalist.

References

2004 births
Living people
American female taekwondo practitioners
21st-century American women